Diphenadione is a vitamin K antagonist that has anticoagulant effects and is used as a rodenticide against rats, mice, voles, ground squirrels and other rodents. The chemical compound is an anti-coagulant with active half-life longer than warfarin and other synthetic 1,3-indandione anticoagulants.

It is toxic to mammals, in all forms; exposure and oral ingestion of the toxin may cause irregular heartbeat and major maladies associated with its impact on blood clotting, depending on dose. As a "second-generation" anticoagulant, diphenadione is more toxic than the first generation compounds (e.g., warfarin). For purposes of treating toxicity on exposure, diphenadione is grouped with other vitamin K antagonists (coumarins and indandiones); despite being directed at rodents and being judged as less hazardous to humans and domestic animals than other rodenticides in use (by the U.S. Environmental Protection Agency), indandione anticoagulants, nevertheless, "may cause human toxicity at a much lower dose than conventional 'first-generation anticoagulants'… and can bioaccumulate in the liver."

References

Further reading
  A safety handbook that explains how incidents of poisoning by various rodenticides are treated.

Indandiones
Vitamin K antagonists
Rodenticides